Frank Newton (born 1902) was an English professional footballer who played as a  centre half.

Career
Born in Romiley, Newton joined Bradford City from Menston Town in August 1921. He made 1 league appearance for the club. He left the club in May 1922 to sign for Northampton Town, and later played for Halifax Town.

Sources

References

1902 births
Date of death missing
English footballers
Bradford City A.F.C. players
Northampton Town F.C. players
Halifax Town A.F.C. players
English Football League players
Association football defenders